Xuxa is an American children's television series hosted by Xuxa Meneghel that aired in first-run syndication between September 13 and December 10, 1993, for a total of 65 episodes. The program, which was based on Rede Globo's Xou da Xuxa, was created by Thomas W. Lynch and Marlene Mattos, with MTM Enterprises handing production. The show works with several blocks, where in each block, a game is presented. The program also received famous people or diverse professionals, as well as educational lessons.

In 1992, the program was in dispute to be created by MTM Enterprises, who had different ideas of a show for the Brazilian children's hosts. However, Xuxa considered the idea of MTM was more interesting, and ended up getting the company in the end.

The program debuted in September 1993; it is entirely based on Xou da Xuxa, but with more American culture aspects, gaining some differences from the original program, because the Paquitas were called Pixies and Xuxa had the help of characters like a panda bear named Jelly, played by E. E. Bell and Jam, the jaguar, played by Mark Caso, Natasha Pearce as Paquita, and Jeff Dunham. Xuxa was the first and only Brazilian to have a television program in the United States.

Background
Xuxa is a combination of a game show/variety show, based on the Brazilian TV program Xou da Xuxa, which discusses various games that stimulate children's learning, with various activities that are guided both by the presenter and by their assistants, Jelly the Panda (E. E. Bell) and Jam the Jaguar (Mark Case).

The show is divided into about five blocks, which served for commercials, as well as in Brazil. During the blocks, she calls some kids on stage for interactive games, where in the end, they all win prizes regardless of the outcome. In other blocks, Xuxa received various professionals (such as esquetistas, swimmers, animal trainers, etc.), who showed their work. She also received some famous people, like Mary-Kate and Ashley Olsen. She also sang versions of her songs known during the program, and in the end, she kissed a chosen child on stage.

History

Background
In 1992, when Xuxa was making a lot of success in Brazil and in Latin American countries such as Argentina, with its programs Xou da Xuxa and El Show de Xuxa, companies MTM Enterprises and DiC Entertainment competed to bring the presenter to the United States with proposals for a program based on the singer, however, she refused the invitations, because she believed that she should learn to speak English first, so she could think about having a program in the US.

Development and release
In 1993, Xuxa returned with the idea of doing a show in the United States, closing with MTM Enterprises, who wanted to do a project based on the original television program of the presenter, while DiC Entertainment wanted to make a program of its own, totally different from what Xuxa imagined. The program was designed to have 65 episodes in the first season, recorded at the CBS network studios (it was filmed in the largest CBS Television City studio in Hollywood) with a screening for The Family Channel, dedicated to children ages 2 to 11. MTM Productions was the former MTM Enterprises, one of the most acclaimed TV producers of the 1970s and 1980s.

Expenditures around weekly production were budgeted between $150,000 to $200,000 according to Broadcasting & Cable magazine, all about building a great setting, with capacity for 150 to 200 children that would be built for the six weeks of recordings. The total cost was more than $2 million.

To some observers, Xuxa's entry into the dominant American market reminded her of another multitalented Brazilian celebrity; commenting on the movement, the editor of Brazil magazine in Los Angeles wrote that "since Carmen Miranda, Brazil did not have an exportable artist."

Also in 1994, Xuxa recorded some unpublished blocks to be inserted in the programs reworked.

The show got 1.74 of audience in the month of November, which means that 16,000 families attended the show during that month.

Controversy
In April 1993, The Globe tabloid published a full-page article in which she called Xuxa a "porn queen," for her posing briefly for Playboy and for her part in the film Love Strange Love, where her character is seen seducing an underage boy. The Globe criticized televangelist Pat Robertson, one of the owners of MTM Enterprises, which produced the new Xuxa show in the US, "pay-TV pastor invites porn queen to present his new show for kids," wrote reporter Bob Michals. In the report, MTM spokesman Gary Berberet tries to soften the controversy by saying, "We knew of his past, but she (Xuxa) brings so much joy to the children of the world that we would not stop her from bringing this joy for America too." The article titled Vaca sagrada, also features statements by David Harrel, biographer of Pat Robertson, "like every successful religious figure, Robertson does not separate God's voice from the voice of opportunity." The journalist Bob Michals describes the presenter as a "provocative woman, who presents her show tucked in a pair of slacks or micro-shoes, high-top boots and revealing jackets."

Award
The program was nominated in 1994 for a Daytime Emmy Award in the category of Best Art Direction / Scenery / Scenography.

Episodes

Ed Alonzo (5 episodes)
Alvin and the Chipmunks
American Gladiators
Birthday Party
Deborah Blando
Butterfly Man (2 episodes)
Rudy Colby (2 episodes)
Jeff Dunham (2 episodes)
Joan Embery (2 episodes)
Expose
Michael Feinstein (2 episodes)
Mitch Gaylord & trampoline
Bob Golic
Harlem Globetrotters
Woody Itson
Waylon Jennings (2 episodes)
Jugglers
Juggling Duo The Mums
David Larible
Amos Levkovitch
Ronn Lucas (2 episodes)
Cheech Marín
Marsupial
Marty Putz
Mess of Mutts (2 episodes)
Mongolian Acrobats
Robert Nelson
Mark Nizer
Olga the Gymnast
Olsen Twins (2 episodes)
Orangutan
Matt Plendl (2 episodes)
Marty Putz
Raven-Symoné
Rebel Ropers
Ringling Bros. and Barnum & Bailey Circus
Skate Squad
Team Rollerblade
Universal Studios Animals
Kim Zmeskal

Home video

VHS: Funtastic Birthday Party and Celebration with Cheech Marin 
The show received five volumes on VHS, released in 1994 by The Family Channel and Sony Wonder. Two of VHS are highly sought after today: Funtastic Birthday Party and Celebration with Cheech Marin.

Talk to Me

Dolls
Rose Art Industries launched a line of Xuxa dolls at the American International Toy Fair in 1993, before the show debuted. The dolls, inspired by the features of the presenter, would be the same size of the famous Barbie doll, and would be sold for $5.99, only the doll and $24.99, when the doll came with accessories. The fashion doll was launched across North America, and was quickly becoming the top-selling ethnic doll in the United States, with 500 dolls sold only on the debut weekend, which took place on the famous Toys R Us Toys Network The doll ended up selling more than expected, which was 200,000 dolls sold, prompting Rose Art to manufacture 50,000 more dolls to surpass demand. The dolls also came with a little K7 tape with songs by Xuxa in English. All these tapes have the name: Xuxa, The Real Superstar.

References

External links
 
Official Xuxa site 

1993 American television series debuts
1993 American television series endings
1990s American variety television series
1990s American children's television series
American children's education television series
American television series based on Brazilian television series
First-run syndicated television programs in the United States
English-language television shows
Xuxa
Television series by MTM Enterprises